Phyllocnistis ramulicola is a moth of the family Gracillariidae. It is known from southern Great Britain and Portugal.

The larvae feed on Salix cinerea, Salix caprea, Salix aurita, Salix fragilis and Salix viminalis. They mine the leaves of their host plant. The mine consists of a long corridor made in the bark, running up or down and hardly widening. Finally, the corridor enters a petiole and a leaf where, close to the base and at the upper side, a white cocoon is spun in which pupation takes place.

References

Phyllocnistis